The U Sports/Curling Canada University Curling Championships are an annual bonspiel, or curling tournament, held for college teams in the U Sports association. The championship is an event sanctioned by and held in association with Curling Canada.

Past champions

References

External links
U Sports Curling Championship website
Curling Canada website

Curling competitions in Canada
U Sports trophies